Chuadanga Sadar is an upazila of Chuadanga District in the Division of Khulna, Bangladesh. Chuadanga was the first capital of Bangladesh.

Geography
It has 41135 households and total area 289.59 km2.

Chuadanga Sadar Upazila is bounded by Alamdanga Upazila in Chuadanga District, on the north, Jibannagar Upazila, in Chuadanga District, on the south, Jhenaidah Sadar, Kotchandpur and Harinakunda Upazilas, in Jhenaidah District, on the east, Damurhuda Upazila in Chuadanga District and West Bengal state of India on the west.

1971 liberation war
The Bir Protik award for gallantry was awarded to Harunur Rashed of Chuadanga District. He was killed on November 27 at Jadupur, under Chuadanga Sadar Upazila. He is buried at Jadupur in the tomb on the day after the elimination of Johor. He fought heroically in many parts of Chuadanga. Every 16 December and 26 March Chuadanga honours his family. He has a son who was born six months after his father's death. His wife's name was Mst. Suraton Nesa. She died in 2004.

Demographics
According to 2011 Bangladesh census, Chuadanga Sadar had a population of 313,935. Males constituted 49.94% of the population and females 50.06. Muslims formed 97.246% of the population, Hindus 2.683%, Christians 0.055% and others 0.016%. Chuadanga Sadar had a literacy rate of 47.54% for the population 7 years and above.

As of the 1991 Bangladesh census, Chuadanga Sadar has a population of 223,247. Males constitute 51.37% of the population, and females 48.63%. This Upazila's eighteen up population is 115,858. Chuadanga Sadar has an average literacy rate of 28.7% (7+ years), and the national average of 32.4% literate.

Administration
Chuadanga Sadar Upazila is divided into Chuadanga Municipality and seven union parishads: Alukdia, Begumpur, Kutubpur, Mominpur, Padmabila, Shankar Chandra, and Titudah. The union parishads are subdivided into 90 mauzas and 129 villages.

Chuadanga Municipality is subdivided into 9 wards and 41 mahallas.

Education
 V.J. (Victoria Jubilee) Government High School
 Chuadanga Adarsha High School
 Adarsha Girls High School
 Collectorate school and college Chuadanga
 Chuadanga Government Girls High School
 Chuadanga Academy School
 Chuadanga Police Line School
 Rail Bazar Govt. Primary School
 105 No Matiar Rahman Malik Government Primary School
 Jhinuk High School
 Taltola Government Primary School
 Bujruk Gorgori Government Primary School
 Chuadanga Technical School and College
 Chuadanga Government College
 Chuadanga Pouro Degree College
 Chuadanga Mohila College
 Badarganj Degree College
 BORO SALUA NEW MODEL COLLEGE
 TATUL SHEIKH COLLEGE
 Badarganj Alia Madrasa
 CHUADANGA FAZIL MADRASAH
 CHUADANGA MOHILA DAKHIL MADRASAH
 First Capital University of Bangladesh (FCUB) 

According to Banglapedia Chuadanga Sadar Upazila have: College 4, Secondary School 27, Technical School 1, Madrasa 8.

Transport
Chuadanga is connected with Capital Dhaka by Road & Train. CD explorer, Royal Express, Purbasha Paribahan, JR Paribahan, Darsana deluxe and Sonartori etc. are the main bus operators.

Notable persons
 Solaiman Haque Joarder, MP

See also
Upazilas of Bangladesh
Districts of Bangladesh
Divisions of Bangladesh

References

Upazilas of Chuadanga District
Chuadanga District
Khulna Division